Slavuta is a city in Shepetivka Raion, Khmelnytskyi Oblast (province) of western Ukraine, located on the Horyn River. Slavuta hosts the administration of Slavuta urban hromada, one of the hromadas of Ukraine. Population:

History
Located in Volhynia, Slavuta was founded by a member of Zaslawski family in 1633. As the family extinguished, all its possessions were transferred to Lubomirski family. Eventually the town was passed on to Marianna Lubomirska who married Pawel Sanguszko who turned the town into the family seat of the Sanguszko princes.

Between 1922 and 1939 it was on the Soviet border with Poland.

In 1791 the Szapira family set up a Hebrew printing press in Slavuta, which published an influential edition of the Talmud. Moshe Feldenkrais was born in Slavuta on May 6, 1904.

Until 18 July 2020, Slavuta was incorporated as a city of oblast significance and served as the administrative center of Slavuta Raion though it did not belong to the raion. In July 2020, as part of the administrative reform of Ukraine, which reduced the number of raions of Khmelnytskyi Oblast to three, the city of Slavuta was merged into Shepetivka Raion.

Jewish history
Slavuta has a rich Jewish history. The town had a prominent Jewish community since near its establishment in the 1600s. Town records show 246 Jewish families in 1765.

The peak of the Jewish population of Slavuta is over 5100 in 1939, about 1/3 of the town's population. In the late 1890s the Jewish population of Slavuta was near 60% at 4900 people.

The Jewish community consisted of farmers, traders, storekeepers, and rabbinical teachers. Slavuta at one point had nearly 200 Jewish owned shops, largely due to Slavuta being established as a prominent trading town and Jewish center. Slavuta also had three established synagogues.

Slavita Shas
A complete Talmud, known as The Slavita Shas was published in 1817 by Rabbi Moshe Shapira, "Av Bais Din and printer of Slavita." The Shapira Press was given a 25-year license to be the sole publishers of the Talmud in their region by a Jewish court.

World War II and beyond
With WWII and the invasion of Nazis, the Jews of Slavuta had a fate similar as the Jews of hundreds of other villages near and far. Many hundreds were able to flee to Tashkent and Siberia. But over 2000 Jews were killed in the Slavuta ghetto and concentration camp. All but one synagogue remained, and the mass grave of Jews killed was left in a field.

After WWII, the town still had a sizable Jewish community. The survivors of the ghetto and concentration camp, the Jews who fled to Siberia and Tashkent, as well as surviving Jews from surrounding villages that had been completely destroyed, came back and resettled. Synagogue papers, furniture, and scripts from the surrounding ravaged communities had been brought to the Slavuta synagogue. Slavuta also had many monuments established, dedicated to the Jews killed during WWII. Today, the Jewish population is nearly 700.

Famous residents
 Henryk Rzewuski, Polish Romantic-era journalist and novelist.
 Evsei Liberman,  Soviet economist.
 Moshé Feldenkrais, physicist and the founder of the Feldenkrais Method, designed to improve human functioning by increasing self-awareness through movement.
 Julian Pęski, ethnic Polish Russian Empire surgeon.
 Chava Shapiro, Hebrew writer and journalist.
 Oleksandr Zinchenko, Ukrainian politician who was Director-General of the National Space Agency of Ukraine from 2009 to 2010.
 Family Sanguszko, a Polish-Lithuanian noble family of the Ruthenian (now Ukrainian) stock from the Gediminid dynasty. Like other princely houses of Polish–Lithuanian Commonwealth.
 Eustachy Erazm Sanguszko, Polish general and politician.
 Roman Sanguszko, Polish aristocrat, patriot, political and social activist.
 Roman Damian Sanguszko, public and political leader, industrialist and landowner, collector.

Gallery

See also
 Slăvuţa River

References

External links

 The official site 
 City Slavuta 
 Department of Education Slavuta 
 The discount card Verkhovna Rada of Ukraine 
 History of Jewish Community in Slavuta
 

Cities in Khmelnytskyi Oblast
Volhynian Governorate
Volhynian Voivodeship (1569–1795)
Shtetls
Cities of regional significance in Ukraine